Hydrosaurus, commonly known as the sailfin dragons or sailfin lizards, is a genus in the family Agamidae. These relatively large lizards are named after the sail-like structure on their tails. They are native to Indonesia (4 species) and the Philippines (1 species) where they are generally found near water, such as rivers and mangrove. Sailfin lizards are semiaquatic and able to run short distances across water using both their feet and tail for support, similar to the basilisks. They are threatened by both habitat loss and overcollection for the wild animal trade.

In the 19th century, the genus was called Lophura, however in 1903 Poche pointed out that the name was pre-occupied by a genus of pheasants. Since Günther in 1873, the Sulawesi populations were considered to belong to H. amboinensis; Denzer et al. in 2020 resurrected H. celebensis and H. microlophus, increasing the number of species from three to five.

They are the only members of the subfamily Hydrosaurinae.

Species
There are currently five valid species according to the Reptile Database,

References

 Hydrosaurus, ZipCodeZoo.com

 
Lizard genera
Taxa named by Johann Jakob Kaup